The Gjirokastër alphabet also known as Veso Bey alphabet is one of the original Albanian language alphabets of the 19th century. It is named after the town of Gjirokastër in South Albania where it was first encountered by the scholar Johann Georg von Hahn, also after Veso Bey, a rich local bey from the influential Alizoti family who provided it to Hahn. Hahn published in 1854 in his "Albanesische Studien", in Jena.

History
According to Hahn, the alphabet was given to him by Veso bey, and had been used that far within Alizoti family circles.

Script
The alphabet, probably cryptic, contains 22 letters.

See also
Vithkuqi alphabet
Vellara alphabet
Elbasan alphabet

References

Albanian scripts
Alphabets
Obsolete writing systems
Constructed scripts